3361 Orpheus (1982 HR) is an Apollo asteroid that was discovered on 24 April 1982 by Carlos Torres at Cerro El Roble Astronomical Station. Its eccentric orbit crosses that of Mars and Earth, and approaches Venus as well. From 1900 to 2100 it passes closer than 30 Gm to Venus 11, Earth 33, and Mars 14 times.

With an observation arc of 36 years, the orbit is well-determined for the next several hundred years.

The orbital solution includes non-gravitational forces.

Missions 

3361 Orpheus had been one of the originally proposed targets for the Near Earth Asteroid Rendezvous (NEAR) mission.

The proposed AIDA mission's spacecraft, Double Asteroid Redirection Test was a fly-by observation of 3361 Orpheus during its trajectory to asteroid 65803 Didymos but later cancelled.

References

External links 
 
 
 

003361
003361
Discoveries by Carlos Torres (astronomer)
Named minor planets
20131207
20211121
19820424